Leigh Gill is an English actor. He is best known for his roles in Game of Thrones and Joker.

Filmography
 Game of Thrones (2016)
 Fantastic Beasts and Where to Find Them (2016)
  Hot Dog  (2018)
 Joker (2019)
 The Witcher (2019)
 The Most Beautiful Day in the World (2019)
 A Woman at Night (2021)
 Who Framed Santa Claus? (2021)
 Lion Versus the Little People (2022)
 Blitz (TBA)

References

External links
 

Living people
21st-century British male actors
Actors with dwarfism
British male film actors
British male television actors
Year of birth missing (living people)